The Estonian Dance Festival is a national dance and gymnastics celebration currently held every five years at the Kalevi Keskstaadion in Tallinn, Estonia.
The festival is maintained and developed by the Estonian Song and Dance Celebration Foundation. The Dance Festival is usually held on the same weekend as the Estonian Song Festival.

History

The first Estonian Games, Dance and Gymnastics festival was held in 1934 and was the precursor of the present dance celebration.

In November 2003, UNESCO declared Estonia's Song and Dance Celebration tradition a masterpiece of the Oral and Intangible Heritage of Humanity.

Gallery

References

Culture in Tallinn
Masterpieces of the Oral and Intangible Heritage of Humanity
Festivals established in 1934
1934 establishments in Estonia
Dance festivals in Europe
Festivals in Estonia